Perry Harmon Newberry (October 16, 1870 – December 6, 1938) was an American writer, actor, and director. He was a past editor and publisher of the Carmel Pine Cone and the fifth mayor of Carmel-by-the-Sea, California. Newberry is best known for his efforts to "keep Carmel free from tourists." At his death the Pine Cone said he was "Perry Newberry...Creator of Carmel." He lived in Carmel for 28 years.

Early life

Newberry was born on October 16, 1870, in Union City, Michigan. His parents were Captain Frank D. Newberry (1840-1912) and Frances "Fannie" Ellsworth Stone (1848-1942). His father served in the American Civil War. His mother, began a career as a writer of children's literature. Newberry married Bertha Blair in 1892.

Career

Newberry was a printer and real estate agent in Chicago. In 1897, he and his wife Bertha, came to San Francisco and was reporter and editor of several newspapers, including on the art department of the San Francisco Examiner, and the San Francisco Post. He purchased the San Francisco Wave in 1901. He went to Frank Coppa's restaurant, known among Bohemians in San Francisco where he heard about an art colony at Carmel-by-the-Sea, California. He and his wife came to Carmel in 1910 by stage coach. He bought one of the first lots sold by Frank Devendorf and Frank Powers in 1910.

Forest Theater

Newberry became involved with the Forest Theater Society of Carmel. On July 9, 1910, Herbert Heron produced the first of the annual theatrical productions at the Forest Theater. The play was David, a biblical drama by Constance Lindsay Skinner under the direction of Garnet Holme of UC Berkeley. Newberry's wife, Bertha, had a role in the play. The play was reviewed in both Los Angeles and San Francisco, and was reported that over 1,000 theatergoers attended the production.

Newberry became actor, producer, playwright, and president at the Forest Theater. The second play was the Twelfth Night, on July 3rd and 4th, 1911. Newberry played the character Sir Toby Belch. In July 1912, Newberry produced the play Alice in Wonderland, at the Forest Theater,   a dramatization of Lewis Carroll's book.

Newberry was part of the cultural circle that included Jack London, Harry Leon Wilson, James Hopper, Mary Hunter Austin, Arnold Genthe, Francis McComas, Xavier Martinez, and Sinclair Lewis.

In 1917, Newberry enlisted as a soldier during World War I and served as a YMCA secretary with the 77th division, American Expeditionary Forces He was gassed in the war. He developed a plan, that the Monterey County endorsed, to arm and equip a military body of men for the defense of the county and coast line.

When Newberry returned from the war, he continued writing short stories and books. He designed and built several houses in Carmel. One is called Sticks And Stones. There is a street with his name in Carmel, named Perry Newberry Way, two blocks between Fourth and Sixth Avenues, east of Carpenter Street.

Politics

In the late 1920s, Newberry, concerned about Carmel's growth and being commercialized, he entered city politics. In 1922, he was elected to the Carmel board of trustees and became the fifth mayor of Carmel. Newberry was known for his efforts to "keep Carmel free from tourists," and Keep Carmel off the Map." 

He was elected again in 1929 as city trustee and a second term as mayor on a similar anti-expansion platform.

Carmel city attorney, Argyll Campbell, shared the same philosophy as Newberry. They were both known for their efforts to prevent the town from becoming "another Santa Cruz," with beach amusements and commercial tourist attractions. Campbell even suggested "building a wall around the town and restricting entry," much like the neighboring community of Pebble Beach, California.

In 1926, Newberry was the editor and co-publisher of the Carmel Pine Cone the town's weekly paper; until he sold the paper in 1935.

Plays
Newberry produced the following plays:

Books

Newberry wrote children’s stories, short stories, and mystery novels. He was an author and co-wrote five detective stories with Carmel writer Alice MacGowan in the 1920s.

Books authored:

   

His poet and playwright wife, Bertha, passed away in January 1934, at a Monterey hospital. Newberry remarried Ida L. Brooks, a Berkeley public health nurse. The ceremony was performed on September 9, 1936, in Salinas, California.

Death

Newberry died on December 6, 1938, from heart failure, in Carmel-by-the-Sea, California, at age 68.

References

External links

 , and Newberry at WorldCat

1870 births
1938 deaths
People from Union City, Michigan
Writers from California
People from Carmel-by-the-Sea, California